Ravulya Nunatak (‘Nunatak Ravulya’ \'nu-na-tak ra-'vu-lya\) is the rocky hill of elevation 1163 m projecting from the ice cap in the northern periphery of Sentinel Range in Ellsworth Mountains, Antarctica.  It is named after Ravulya Peak and Golyama (Big) Ravulya Peak in Lozen Mountain, Bulgaria.

Location
US mapping in 1961.

Maps
 Newcomer Glacier.  Scale 1:250 000 topographic map.  Reston, Virginia: US Geological Survey, 1961.
 Antarctic Digital Database (ADD). Scale 1:250000 topographic map of Antarctica. Scientific Committee on Antarctic Research (SCAR). Since 1993, regularly updated.

Notes

References
 Ravulya Nunatak. SCAR Composite Gazetteer of Antarctica.
 Bulgarian Antarctic Gazetteer. Antarctic Place-names Commission. (details in Bulgarian, basic data in English)

External links
 Ravulya Nunatak. Copernix satellite image

Ellsworth Mountains
Bulgaria and the Antarctic
Nunataks of Ellsworth Land